Judge West may refer to:

Caleb Walton West (1844–1909), municipal judge in Kentucky
DuVal West (1861–1949), judge of the United States District Court for the Western District of Texas
Elmer Gordon West (1914–1992), judge of the United States District Courts for the Eastern and Middle Districts of Louisiana
Lee Roy West (1929–2020), judge of the United States District Court for the Western District of Oklahoma
Roger Blake West (1928–1978), judge of the United States District Court for the Eastern District of Louisiana
Samuel H. West (1872–1938), judge of the United States District Court for the Northern District of Ohio

See also
Justice West (disambiguation)